In the Court of the Wrestling Let's is the debut studio album by British indie rock band Let's Wrestle.  It was released on June 29, 2009 through Stolen Recordings.

The name of the album appears to be a tribute to highly influential progressive rock band King Crimson's debut album In the Court of the Crimson King which also features the name of the band but with the two words swapped around.

Track listing

References

2009 debut albums
Stolen Recordings albums
Let's Wrestle albums